José Echegaray y Eizaguirre (19 April 183214 September 1916) was a Spanish civil engineer, mathematician, statesman, and one of the leading Spanish dramatists of the last quarter of the 19th century. He was awarded the 1904 Nobel Prize in Literature "in recognition of the numerous and brilliant compositions which, in an individual and original manner, have revived the great traditions of the Spanish drama".

Early life 
He was born in Madrid on 19 April 1832. His father, a doctor and institute professor of Greek, was from Aragon and his mother was from Navarra. He spent his childhood in Murcia, where he finished his elementary school education. It was there, at the Murcia Institute, where he first gained his love for mathematics. While still a child he read Goethe, Homer, and Balzac, readings that alternated with those of mathematicians like Gauss, Legendre, and Lagrange.

At the age of twenty, he left the Madrid School with a Civil Engineering degree, which he had obtained as first in his class, and he had to move to Almeria and Granada to begin working at his first job.

Professor and scientist 
In 1854 he began teaching a class at the Engineering School, working as a secretary there also. He taught mathematics, stereotomy, hydraulics, descriptive geometry, and differential and physical calculus from that year until 1868. From 1858 to 1860 he was also a professor at the Assistants' School of Public Works.

He became a member of the Society of Political Economy, helped to found the magazine , and took a prominent part in propagating free trade doctrines in the press and on the platform.

He was clearly marked out for office, and when the revolution of 1868 overthrew the monarchy, he resigned his post for a place in the revolutionary cabinet.

Government service
Echegaray also entered politics later in his life. As a founding member of the republican Radical Democratic Party, he enjoyed a career in the government sector, being appointed Minister of Education, of Public Works and Finance Minister successively between 1867 and 1874. He retired from politics after the Bourbon restoration in 1874.

Literary career
Theater had always been the love of José Echegaray's life. Although he had written earlier plays (La Hija natural and La Última Noche, both in 1867), he truly became a dramatist in 1874. His plays reflected his sense of duty, which had made him famous during his time in the governmental offices. Dilemmas centered on duty and morality are the motif of his plays. He replicated the achievements of his predecessors of the Spanish Golden Age, remaining a prolific playwright.

His most famous play is El gran Galeoto, a drama written in the grand nineteenth century manner of melodrama. It is about the poisonous effect that unfounded gossip has on a middle-aged man's happiness. Echegaray filled it with elaborate stage instructions that illuminate what we would now consider a hammy style of acting popular in the 19th century. Paramount Pictures filmed it as a silent with the title changed to The World and His Wife, and it was the basis for a later film The Great Galeoto. His most remarkable plays are O locura o santidad (Saint or Madman?, 1877); Mariana (1892); El estigma (1895); La duda, 1898; and El loco Dios (God, the fool, 1900).

Among his other famous plays are La esposa del vengador (1874) (The Avenger's Wife); En el puño de la espada (1875) (In the Sword's Handle); En el pilar y en la cruz (1878) (On the Stake and on the Cross); and Conflicto entre dos deberes (1882) (Conflict of Two Duties).

Along with the Provençal poet Frédéric Mistral, he was awarded the Nobel Prize for Literature in 1904, after having been nominated that year by a member of the Royal Spanish Academy, making him the first Spaniard to win the prize.

José Echegaray maintained constant activity until his death on 14 September 1916 in Madrid. His extensive work did not stop growing in his old age: in the final stage of his life he wrote 25 or 30 mathematical physics volumes. At the age of 83 he commented: I cannot die, because if I am going to write my mathematical physics encyclopedia, I need at least 25 more years.

References

External links

  with the prize motivation
 Elsevier Publishing Co. biography
 
List of works
 
 
 

1832 births
1916 deaths
Writers from Madrid
Spanish dramatists and playwrights
Spanish male dramatists and playwrights
Nobel laureates in Literature
Spanish Nobel laureates
Economy and finance ministers of Spain
Members of the Royal Spanish Academy
19th-century Spanish mathematicians
Complutense University of Madrid alumni
19th-century male writers
Government ministers during the First Spanish Republic